A-kinase anchor protein 7 isoform gamma is an enzyme that in humans is encoded by the AKAP7 gene.

Function 

This gene encodes a member of the A-kinase anchoring protein (AKAP) family, a group of functionally related proteins that bind to a regulatory subunit (RII) of cAMP-dependent protein kinase A (PKA) and target the enzyme to specific subcellular compartments. AKAPs have a common RII-binding domain, but contain different targeting motifs responsible for directing PKA to distinct intracellular locations.

References

External links

Further reading 

 
 
 
 
 

A-kinase-anchoring proteins